Dikshul is a 1943 Indian Bengali film directed by Premankur Atorthy. The film was produced by New Theatres Ltd, Calcutta. Its music direction was by Pankaj Mullick and the cinematographer was Rabi Dhar. The lyricist for the film was Kazi Nazrul Islam who was famous as the "Bidrohi Kavi" ("Rebel Poet"). The film marked the entry of actress and singer Binota Roy as a playback singer. The cast included 
Mihir Bhattacharya, Chhabi Biswas, Tulsi Chakraborty, Ashu Bose, Sailen Chowdhury, Harimohan Bose, and Radharani.

Cast
 Chhabi Biswas
 Anjali Ray
 Sailen Chowdhury
 Renuka Ray
 Radharani
 Tulsi Chakraborty
 Mihir Bhattacharya
 Ashu Bose
 Harimohan Bose
 Naresh Bose
 Manorama
 Ushabati

References

External links

1943 films
Bengali-language Indian films
1940s Bengali-language films
Films directed by Premankur Atorthy
Indian black-and-white films
Films scored by Pankaj Mullick